Club Natació Sabadell is a Spanish aquatic sports club from Sabadell.

Founded in 1916, it is best known for its women's water polo team, which has been the most successful team in the national championship in recent years with nine titles since 2000. In 2011 it won the European Cup, becoming the first Spanish team to attain this. The men's team won its third national cup in 2012.

The Club brought the most athletes to the Summer Olympics in London 2012, a total of 8. These included six members of the women's water polo team who gained silver medals: Laura Ester, Anna Espar, Matilde Ortiz, Jennifer Pareja, Pilar Peña Carrasco and Maica García Godoy. Mireia Belmonte García, silver medalist in London 2012, is the most prolific swimmer of this club.

Titles
Women Water Polo:
LEN Champions' Cup: 5
2011, 2013, 2014, 2016, 2019
LEN Super Cup: 3
2013, 2014, 2016
Spanish League: 17
2000, 2001, 2002, 2004, 2005, 2007, 2008, 2009, 2011, 2012, 2013, 2014, 2015, 2016, 2017, 2018, 2019
Spanish Cup: 16
2001, 2002, 2004, 2005, 2008, 2009, 2010, 2011, 2012, 2013, 2014, 2015, 2017, 2018, 2019, 2020
Spanish Supercup: 11
2009, 2010, 2011, 2012, 2013, 2014, 2015, 2016, 2017, 2018, 2020
Men's Water Polo:
 LEN Euro Cup:  1
2022

Spanish Cup: 3
1998, 2005, 2012
Spanish Supercup: 4
2002, 2005, 2012, 2020

References

External links
Official website
Basketball team profile at Spanish Basketball Federation website

Water polo clubs in Catalonia
Sabadell
LEN Women's Champions' Cup clubs
Sports clubs established in 1916